Herberts Vasiļjevs (born May 27, 1976) is a retired Latvian professional ice hockey player who played as a center and right winger. In the course of his playing career, he saw action in 51 NHL contests and spent more than ten years playing in the German DEL with Krefeld Pinguine. He represented the Latvian national teams at three Olympic Games.

Playing career 
Herberts Vasiļjevs is a son of Haralds Vasiļjevs, a well-known Latvian ice hockey player and coach, who coached the Latvian national ice hockey team from 1999 to 2001. He grew up in Latvia, but came to Germany in the early 1990s when his father accepted the player-coach position of the senior team at ERC Westfalen 90 Dortmund. Herberts played in the junior team of Dortmund. His father later moved on to coach the junior team of Krefeld Pinguine of the German DEL (Deutsche Eishockey League).

After playing the 1994/95 season for Krefeld Pinguine, Herberts Vasiļjevs moved to North America where he played junior and minor league hockey. He was then signed by the Florida Panthers of NHL as a free agent in 1998. 

Vasiļjevs was one of three Latvian players who have reached NHL without ever being drafted in an NHL Entry Draft (the other two were Pēteris Skudra and Raitis Ivanāns). From 1998 to 2002, Vasiļjevs played 51 NHL games with the Florida Panthers, Atlanta Thrashers and Vancouver Canucks, scoring 8 goals and 7 assists. After spending the entire 2002–03 season with Vancouver Canucks' minor league affiliate, Manitoba Moose of the AHL, Vasiļjevs was not re-signed by the Canucks.

He continued his career in the Russian Superleague and the DEL. In 2005, he returned to the Krefeld Pinguine organization, the team where he started his professional hockey career 11 years earlier. In the summer of 2010, after long negotiations, Vasiļjevs re-signed a new contract with Krefeld up until 2013.

On May 21, 2015, Vasiljevs solidified his status amongst Krefeld's history in agreeing to a one-year extension to return for an 11th season with the Pinguine. He announced his retirement on February 26, 2017.

Career statistics

Regular season and playoffs

International

References

External links
 
 
 
 

1976 births
Living people
Amur Khabarovsk players
Atlanta Thrashers players
Beast of New Haven players
Carolina Monarchs players
Expatriate ice hockey players in Russia
Florida Panthers players
Guelph Storm players
Ice hockey players at the 2006 Winter Olympics
Ice hockey players at the 2010 Winter Olympics
Ice hockey players at the 2014 Winter Olympics
Kentucky Thoroughblades players
Krefeld Pinguine players
Knoxville Cherokees players
Latvian ice hockey right wingers
Manitoba Moose players
Nürnberg Ice Tigers players
Olympic ice hockey players of Latvia
Orlando Solar Bears (IHL) players
Port Huron Border Cats players
Ice hockey people from Riga
Undrafted National Hockey League players
Vancouver Canucks players